Olavo Martins de Oliveira (9 November 1927 – 12 March 2004), simply known as Olavo, was a Brazilian footballer. Mainly a central defender, he was equally capable of acting as a right back.

Honours

Club
Corinthians
Campeonato Paulista: 1953, 1954
Torneio Rio – São Paulo: 1953, 1954

Santos
Campeonato Paulista: 1962, 1964, 1965
Intercontinental Cup: 1962

References

External links

1927 births
2004 deaths
Sportspeople from Santos, São Paulo
Brazilian footballers
Association football defenders
Associação Atlética Portuguesa (Santos) players
Sport Club Corinthians Paulista players
Santos FC players
Clube Náutico Capibaribe players
Brazil international footballers
Brazilian football managers
Santos FC managers